The 1973 Alamo 500 was a NASCAR Winston Cup Series racing event that took place on June 10, 1973, at Texas World Speedway in College Station, Texas.

The race car drivers still had to commute to the races using the same stock cars that competed in a typical weekend's race through a policy of homologation (and under their own power). This policy was in effect until roughly 1975. By 1980, NASCAR had completely stopped tracking the year model of all the vehicles and most teams did not take stock cars to the track under their own power anymore.

Race report
It took three hours and twenty-six minutes to resolve a race spanning 250 laps. Richard Petty defeated Darrell Waltrip by at least two laps in front of 27000 people; Waltrip's second-place run was just his second-ever Winston Cup "top five" finish and his first on a superspeedway. There were always large margins of victory at Texas World Speedway because of many long green-flag runs. Drivers were either became very cautious or very lucky and they managed to avoid having to deal with relatively long yellow-flag runs. Five cautions were handed out by NASCAR officials for 27 laps.

Twenty-eight lead changes were reported amongst five leaders.  Nearly two years later, Darrell Waltrip would actually win a superspeedway race.

Only manual transmission vehicles were allowed to participate in this race; a policy that NASCAR has retained to the present day.

J.D. McDuffie would make a top-ten finish here; a rare occurrence considering that he finished last-place the most often. Richie Panch would become the last-place finisher of the race due to an ignition problem on the first lap. This would be the last race done at Texas World Speedway until the 1979 NASCAR Winston Cup Series season. There were 38 American-born drivers on the racing grid. Bob Whitlow and Ed Sczech would make their NASCAR debuts at this racing event; Whitlow was driving a second car for Ed Negre.

Petty would receive a prize amount of $17,820 for winning the race ($ when considering inflation) while Panch would collect a mere $920 as his "reward" for finishing in last place ($ when considering inflation).

Notable crew chiefs who fully participated in this race were Tim Brewer, Jake Elder, Travis Carter, Harry Hyde, Dale Inman, and Bud Moore.

Qualifying

Finishing order

 Richard Petty (No. 43)
 Darrell Waltrip (No. 95)
 Joe Frasson† (No. 11)
 Cale Yarborough (No. 18)
 Cecil Gordon (No. 24)
 Buddy Baker† (No. 71)
 Benny Parsons† (No. 72)
 Ramo Stott (No. 9)
 David Sisco (No. 05)
 J.D. McDuffie† (No. 70)
 H.B. Bailey† (No. 36)
 Jabe Thomas (No. 25)
 Frank Warren (No. 79)
 Bill Champion† (No. 10)
 James Hylton† (No. 48)
 Walter Ballard (No. 30)
 Buddy Arrington (No. 67)
 Charlie Roberts (No. 77)
 Henley Gray (No. 19)
 Ed Sczech* (No. 61)
 Bob Whitlow (No. 08)
 Dean Dalton (No. 7)
 Tony Bettenhausen Jr.*† (No. 38)
 Lennie Pond* (No. 54)
 Raymond Williams* (No. 47)
 Bobby Allison* (No. 12)
 Elmo Langley*† (No. 64)
 Coo Coo Marlin*† (No. 14)
 Marty Robbins*† (No. 42)
 Jimmy Crawford*† (No. 22)
 D.K. Ulrich* (No. 40)
 Bobby Isaac*† (No. 15)
 Dave Marcis* (No. 2)
 Rick Newsom*† (No. 20)
 Richard Childress* (No. 96)
 Mel Larson* (No. 04)
 Ed Negre* (No. 8)
 Richie Panch*† (No. 98)

† signifies that the driver is known to be deceased 
* Driver failed to finish race

References

Alamo 500
Alamo
NASCAR races at Texas World Speedway